John Jacob Fanning  (1863 – June 10, 1917), was a professional baseball pitcher in Major League Baseball for the 1889 Indianapolis Hoosiers and 1894 Philadelphia Phillies of the National League. He also played in the minor leagues from 1886 through 1896.

External links

1863 births
Date of birth missing
1917 deaths
Major League Baseball pitchers
Indianapolis Hoosiers (NL) players
Philadelphia Phillies players
Baseball players from New Jersey
19th-century baseball players
Buffalo Bisons (minor league) players
Davenport Hawkeyes players
Denver Grizzlies (baseball) players
Denver Mountaineers players
Omaha Omahogs players
Omaha Lambs players
Oakland Colonels players
People from South Orange, New Jersey
San Francisco Metropolitans players
Sportspeople from Essex County, New Jersey
Stockton River Pirates players
Sacramento Senators players
New Orleans Pelicans (baseball) players
Minneapolis Millers (baseball) players
Victoria Chappies players